Christoph Franke (born 20 December 1944) is a German football coach and former player.

References

External links
 
 

1944 births
Living people
East German footballers
1. FC Lokomotive Leipzig players
Chemnitzer FC players
German football managers
Dynamo Dresden managers
Chemnitzer FC managers
Association football defenders